Eli Elbaz (Hebrew: אלי אלבז born 21 January 1992) is an Israeli footballer currently playing for Maccabi Ironi Ashdod in the Liga Alef.

Club career
Elbaz grew up in the Hapoel Haifa youth academy. He made his debut with the senior team on 17 September 2011.
On January 8, 2014 he was loaned to Maccabi Ahi Nazareth.

Apollon Smyrni
On 2 July 2017, he signed a two years' contract with Greek Superleague club Apollon Smyrni for an undisclosed fee. He combined his official debut with a wonderful free-kick goal in the season's opener, a 1-1 away draw against Atromitos. On 25 November 2017 he opened the score in a dramatic 1-1 home win against Lamia. On 2 December he scored with an excellent solo in an eventual 3-1 away loss against Olympiakos.

References

External links

1992 births
Israeli Jews
Living people
Israeli footballers
Hapoel Haifa F.C. players
Maccabi Ahi Nazareth F.C. players
Ironi Tiberias F.C. players
Hapoel Kfar Saba F.C. players
Apollon Smyrnis F.C. players
Maccabi Petah Tikva F.C. players
Bnei Sakhnin F.C. players
Sektzia Ness Ziona F.C. players
Hapoel Ashdod F.C. players
Hapoel Kfar Shalem F.C. players
Maccabi Ironi Ashdod F.C. players
Israeli Premier League players
Liga Leumit players
Super League Greece players
Israeli people of Moroccan-Jewish descent
Footballers from Kiryat Bialik
Expatriate footballers in Greece
Israeli expatriate sportspeople in Greece
Association football forwards